The Mauna Kea Trail, also known as the Humuʻula Trail, is a hiking route leading from the Onizuka Center for International Astronomy to the summit of Mauna Kea, the highest volcano on the island of Hawaii.

Description 
Cairns and reflective posts mark the route above .

Astronomical instruments are located near the summit since the atmosphere is substantially thinner at higher elevations than at sea level. Mauna Loa is visible on clear days from the summit area, as well as along most of the trail.

The center is accessible by car from the Saddle Road (Hawaii Route 200) and then north on the Mauna Kea Access Road. Registration is requested and a drop box is available for hikers who start before the visitor center opens. The first  of the trail is on the Mauna Kea Access Road after which the trail goes left onto a dirt path. From  the path consists of scree. From  the area is predominantly a'a lava flows and is not as steep. At  the road forks, with one path going to Lake Waiau and the other fork to the summit. A final trail segment leads to the summit.

Since the mountain is considered sacred to the Native Hawaiians, a sign is posted asking visitors to not access the summit cinder cone, which is named Puʻu Wekiu. The sign reads:

References

External links
Maunakea Observatories, Institute for Astronomy, University of Hawaii
Mauna Kea, Global Volcanism Program, Smithsonian Institution

Hiking trails in Hawaii
Protected areas of Hawaii (island)